is a Japanese actor. He made his acting debut in the television series Pride. He appeared in Hiroshi Shinagawa's 2009 debut film Drop. He also co-starred with Kōji Yakusho in Takashi Miike's 13 Assassins.

Filmography

Films
 Break Through! (2005)
 Densha Otoko (2005)
 The Fast and the Furious: Tokyo Drift (2006)
 Waiting in the Dark (2006)
 Midnigth Eagle (2007)
 Hero (2007)
 Crows Zero (2007)
 Tokyo Sonata (2008)
 Chameleon (2008)
 L: Change the World (2008)
 Fish Story (2009)
 Yellow Kid (2009)
 Crows Zero 2 (2009)
 Drop (2009)
 13 Assassins (2010)
 Golden Slumber (2010)
 Space Battleship Yamato (2010)
 Helldriver (2010)
 Zebraman 2: Attack on Zebra City (2010)
 Parade (2010)
 The Detective Is in the Bar (2011)
 Shodo Girls: Blue Blue Sky [Aoi Aoi Sora] (2011) - Kazuki Yatsushiro 
 Gaku: Minna no Yama (2011)
 Ninja Kids!!! (2011)
 Hara-Kiri: Death of a Samurai (2011)
 Ace Attorney (2012)
 Stand Up! Vanguard (2012)
 Library Wars (2013)
 The Great Passage (2013)
 Why Don't You Play in Hell? (2013)
 7 Days Report (2014)
 Danger Dolls (2014)
 Okāsan no Ki (2015)
 Namae (2018)
 Lady in White (2018)
 Hell Girl (2019)
 Iwane: Sword of Serenity (2019)
 Gozen (2019)
 Janitor (2021)
 In the Wake (2021) - Suzuki
 Nishinari Goro's 400 Million Yen (2021)
 Noise (2022)
 Phases of the Moon (2022)
 Bad City (2023) - Murata

Television
 Pride (2004)
 Genseishin Justirisers (2004-2005)
 Densha Otoko (2005)
 Lion-Maru G (2006)
 Kamen Rider Den-O (2007)
 Heaven's Flower The Legend of Arcana (2011)
 Ghost Writer's Homicide Coverage (2012–15)
 Kamen Rider Gaim (2013)
 Hibana (2016)
 Miotsukushi Ryōrichō (2017)
 Kuroshoin no Rokubei (2018), Ōmura Masujirō
 Mob Psycho 100 Live Action (2018)
 The Yagyu Conspiracy (2020), Karasuma Ayamaro
 Reach Beyond the Blue Sky (2021), Kawamura Ejūrō
 What Will You Do, Ieyasu? (2023), Honda Tadazane

References

External links
Talent Office's profile 
Personal blog 

1978 births
Japanese male actors
Living people
People from Osaka
Male actors from Osaka